Kaffeklubben Island or Coffee Club Island is an uninhabited island lying off the northern tip of Greenland. It contains the northernmost undisputed point of land on Earth.

Discovery
The first recorded sighting of Kaffeklubben Island was made by American explorer Robert Peary in 1900; however, the island was not visited until 1921. When the Danish explorer Lauge Koch set foot on the island, it received its name after the coffee club in the University of Copenhagen Geological Museum.

In 1969, a Canadian team calculated that its northernmost tip is  farther north than Cape Morris Jesup, the northernmost point of mainland Greenland, thus claiming its record as the most northerly point on land.

Since its record as the northernmost point of land was established, several gravel banks have been discovered in the sea to the north of the island, such as Oodaaq, 83-42, and ATOW1996; however, there is debate as to whether such gravel banks should be considered for the record since they rarely are permanent, being swallowed regularly by the moving ice sheets, being shifted in tides, or becoming submerged in the ocean.

Geography

Its most northerly point is 4.4 km north of that of Cape Morris Jesup.

Vegetation
Despite the harsh environment, vegetation grows on Kaffeklubben island, including various mosses, liverworts, lichens, and the flowering plants: Saxifraga oppositifolia (purple saxifrage) and Papaver radicatum (arctic poppy).

See also
List of islands of Greenland
ATOW1996, a gravel bank with a disputed claim as the most northerly land area
83-42, a gravel bank with a disputed claim as northernmost point of land
List of northernmost items

References

Extreme points of Earth
Uninhabited islands of Greenland